C. Douglass Buck (1890–1965) was a U.S. Senator from Delaware 1943 to 1949. Senator Buck may also refer to:

Clarence F. Buck (1870–1944), Illinois State Senate
Daniel Buck (judge) (1829–1905), Minnesota State Senate
George L. Buck (1866–1939), Wisconsin State Senate
James R. Buck (born 1945), Indiana State Senate
Leonard W. Buck (1834–1895), California State Senate